The 1938 Estonian Cup was the first season of the Estonian football knockout tournament. 11 teams took part of the competition. In that time there was no penalty shoot-out after extra time. Because of that another final had to be arranged as the first match ended 1–1. In the second match, played on November 6 in Kadriorg Stadium, VS Sport Tallinn narrowly won over Tallinna Jalgpalliklubi, thus becoming the first cup champions of Estonia.

Preliminary round

Quarter-finals

Semi-finals

Final 1 & 2

References
Estonia Cup Finals, RSSSF

Cup
Estonian Cup seasons